Radishchevsky (masculine), Radishchevskaya (feminine), or Radishchevskoye (neuter) may refer to:
Radishchevsky District, a district of Ulyanovsk Oblast, Russia
Radishchevskoye Urban Settlement, several municipal urban settlements in Russia